The West African long-tailed shrew (Crocidura muricauda) is a species of mammal in the family Soricidae. It can be found in Ivory Coast, Ghana, Guinea, Liberia, and Sierra Leone. Its natural habitat is subtropical or tropical moist lowland forests.

References
 Hutterer, R. & Howell, K. 2004.  Crocidura muricauda.   2006 IUCN Red List of Threatened Species.   Downloaded on 30 July 2007.

Crocidura
Mammals described in 1900
Taxonomy articles created by Polbot